A variety of isomers of methyl indole derivatives are known:
1-methylindole
2-methylindole
skatole (3-methylindole)
4-methylindole
5-methylindole
6-methylindole
7-methylindole

External links